Garden Cove is an unincorporated community in Monroe County, Florida, United States, located in the upper Florida Keys on Key Largo immediately southwest and bordering the Census-designated place (CDP) of North Key Largo.

Geography

References

External links
History of Key Largo

Unincorporated communities in Monroe County, Florida
Unincorporated communities in Florida
Populated coastal places in Florida on the Atlantic Ocean